Głuszynko , , is a village in the administrative district of Gmina Potęgowo, within Słupsk County, Pomeranian Voivodeship, in northern Poland.

Before 1648 the area was part of Duchy of Pomerania, 1648-1945 Prussia and Germany. For the history of the region, see History of Pomerania.

The village has a population of 250.

References

Villages in Słupsk County